Drosera rotundifolia, the round-leaved sundew, roundleaf sundew, or common sundew, is a carnivorous species of flowering plant that grows in bogs, marshes and fens. One of the most widespread sundew species, it has a circumboreal distribution, being found in all of northern Europe, much of Siberia, large parts of northern North America, Korea and Japan but is also found as far south as California, Mississippi and Alabama in the United States of America and in New Guinea.

Description

The leaves of the common sundew are arranged in a basal rosette. The upper surface of the lamina is densely covered with red glandular hairs that secrete a sticky mucilage.

The flowers grow on one side of a single slender, hairless stalk that emanates from the centre of the leaf rosette. White or pink in colour, the five-petalled flowers produce , light brown, slender, tapered seeds.

In the winter, D. rotundifolia produces a hibernaculum to survive the cold conditions. This consists of a bud of tightly curled leaves at ground level.

Carnivory

The plant feeds on insects, which are attracted to the glistening drops of mucilage, loaded with a sugary substance, covering its leaves. It has evolved this carnivorous behaviour in response to its habitat, which is usually poor in nutrients or is so acidic that nutrient availability is severely decreased. The plant uses enzymes to dissolve the insects – which become stuck to the glandular tentacles – and extract ammonia (from proteins) and other nutrients from their bodies. The ammonia replaces the nitrogen that other plants absorb from the soil, and plants that are placed in a high-nitrogen environment rely less upon nitrogen from captured insects.

It has been assumed that insects were also attracted to the bright red color of the common sundew, but studies using artificial traps have suggested that color does not affect prey attraction.  New climates have been discovered with new plant growth but don’t have the food associated with the requirements for growth.  In areas that lack this food associated for growth, new studies have been conducted to determine how these plants are able to grow in these diverse climates where these plants area able to flourish.  In a study by L.M. Thoren et al. posted in New Phytologist, the carnivory of the Drosera rotundifolia was tested against growing conditions where the plant's insect prey was not sufficient to promote proper growth.  The group tested the plants ability to grow with limited prey but increased inorganic nutrients within the soil.  The results revealed the ability of the plant to utilize the nutrients over the normal prey which caused the reduction in carnivory investment of the plant.  These results showed that the plant would adapt to the current environment for growth utilizing available resources as food.

Distribution

In North America, the common sundew is found in all parts of Canada except the Canadian Prairies and the tundra regions, southern Alaska, the Pacific Northwest, and along the Appalachian Mountains south to Georgia and Louisiana. In the western United States, roundleaf sundew is found in mountain fens as far south as the Sierra Nevada of California and in a disjunct cluster of fen occurrences in the Rocky Mountains of Colorado. In the eastern United States, the sundew plant is found in parts stretching from Nova Scotia down the coast into Florida.  In addition to Georgia, plants are now being seen in Alabama and Mississippi.  West of the Mississippi River plants are located along the pacific coast from Alaska down the coast to California with new plants detected in Iowa, Minnesota and in two recently recorded sites in Gunnison County, Colorado and Bottineau County, North Dakota.

It is found in much of Europe, including the British Isles, most of France, the Benelux nations, Germany, Denmark, Switzerland, Czech Republic, Poland, Belarus, the Baltic countries, Sweden and Finland, as well as northern portions of Italy, Portugal, Spain, Romania, mountain regions of Bulgaria and in Iceland and southern regions of Norway and Greenland. It is infrequent in Austria and Hungary, and some populations are scattered around the Balkans.

In Britain, this is the most common form of sundew and it can be found on Exmoor, Dartmoor, Sedgemoor, the Lake District, Shropshire, Pennines and in Scotland, among other places. It is usually found in bogs, marshes and in hollows or corries on the sides of mountains. It is the county flower of Shropshire.

In Asia, it is found across Siberia and Japan, as well as parts of Turkey, the Caucasus region, the Kamchatka Peninsula southern parts of Korea, and parts of China. Populations can also be found on the islands of New Guinea and Mindanao.

Habitat

The common sundew thrives in wetlands such as marshes and fens. It is also found in wet stands of black spruce, Sphagnum bogs, silty and boggy shorelines and wet sands. It prefers open, sunny or partly sunny habitats.

Conservation
The round-leaved sundew is classified as Least Concern in the IUCN red list. 
In North America, it is considered endangered in the US states of Illinois and Iowa, exploitably vulnerable in New York, and threatened in Tennessee. . The species is ranked S2, imperiled, in the state of Colorado.

Cultivation
D. rotundifolia is one of the temperate species of Drosera cultivated by growers interested in carnivorous plants. To be grown successfully, plants of the wild species must be given a substantial period of winter dormancy during which they form hibernacula. The cultivar D. rotundifolia 'Charles Darwin' can be grown more successfully without a period of dormancy.

Medicinal properties

According to D.H. Paper, et al., Drosera rotundifolia plant extracts show great efficacy as an anti-inflammatory and antispasmodic, more so than D. madagascariensis, as a result of the flavonoids such as hyperoside, quercetin and isoquercetin, but not the naphthoquinones present in the extracts. The flavonoids are thought to affect the M3 muscarinic receptors in smooth muscle, causing the antispasmodic effects. Ellagic acid in D. rotundifolia extracts has also been shown to have antiangiogenic effects.

Notes

References

 Den virtuella floran - Rundsileshår. Naturhistoriska riksmuseet, 1997. Accessed 31 May 2005.

Gallery

External links 

rotundifolia
Carnivorous plants of Asia
Carnivorous plants of Europe
Carnivorous plants of North America
Plants described in 1753
Taxa named by Carl Linnaeus